On the morning of July 9, 1850 in Tabriz, a 30-year-old Persian merchant known as the Báb was charged with apostasy and shot by order of the Prime Minister of the Persian Empire. The events surrounding his execution have been the subject of controversy among researchers, and are regarded as miraculous by followers of the Baháʼí Faith, who consider him to be a Manifestation of God.

The Báb and one of his companions were suspended on a wall and a large firing squad prepared to shoot. When the smoke cleared after the first firing of bullets, the Báb was missing. Reports continue by stating that the Báb was found back in his prison room finishing dictation to his secretary. Other sources, which include Persian and European reports, give a variety of accounts, some in agreement with the miracle-like Baháʼí story, and some indicating a less miraculous event. All agree that he survived the first firing squad, and was killed by the second.

For many years after his death, the remains of the Báb were secretly transferred from place to place until they were brought to their final resting place at the Shrine of the Báb in Haifa on the middle terrace of the Baháʼí Gardens.

The anniversary of this event is commemorated by members of the Baháʼí Faith at noon on Rahmat 16 (Sharaf) (of the Baháʼí Calendar - i.e., July 9 or July 10). It is one of nine Holy Days when work is suspended.

Execution order
In 1850 a new prime-minister, Amir Kabir, ordered the execution of the Báb; he was brought to Tabriz, where he would be killed by a firing squad.  The night before his execution, as he was being conducted to his cell, a young man, Anís (sometimes called Mulla Muhammad Ali), threw himself at the feet of the Báb, wanting to be killed with the Báb.  He was immediately arrested and placed in the same cell as the Báb.

On the morning of July 9, 1850, the Báb was taken to the Tabriz courtyard filled with nearly ten thousand people wishing to watch his execution.  The Báb and Anís were suspended on a wall and the firing squad of 750 rifles prepared to shoot.

Bábi/Baháʼí account
Here is an account which is in line with the common Baháʼí Faith view by historian H.M. Balyuzi, a Hand of the Cause of God, who published several carefully researched histories about the Baháʼí Faith and its central figures:

Western accounts
These events were witnessed by western journalists. Provided below is one source that is attributed to Sir Justin Sheil, Queen Victoria's Envoy Extraordinary and Minister Plenipotentiary in Tehran and written to Lord Palmerston, the British Secretary of State for Foreign Affairs, July 22, 1850.

Shoghi Effendi also prints a large selection of western quotes in his book God Passes By (p. 55), however most are unsourced.

Mírzá Mihdí Khán Zaímu'd-Dawlih
Mírzá Mihdí Khán Zaímu'd-Dawlih was the son of a Shiʻite cleric who was present at the execution of the Báb and who took his son to the barracks square to review the events he witnessed. Zaímu'd-Dawlih recounted his father's version in a book, Miftáh-i-Bábu'l-Abváb ya Taríkh-i-Báb va Bahá (Key to the Gate of Gates, or the History of the Báb and Bahá), published about A.H. 1310 (about 1896). The work is a polemically anti-Baháʼí book. But the account of the execution (which is lengthy) includes the following details:
1. The Báb and Anís were suspended about three meters (10') above the ground on a rope and fired on by a Christian regiment.
2. The bullets cut the rope and one bullet wounded Anís.
3. The Báb ran into one of the rooms in the barracks.
4. The Báb was brought back out and he and Anís were shot again, this time fatally.

See also
 Capital punishment in Iran

Notes

References 

Browne, E.G. (1893). The New History of the Báb. Cambridge. Includes a lengthy introduction, the translation and then appendices.

Further reading
 David Merrick (2019). Martyrdom of the Bab: An Outline for Researchers.
 Related material on Baháʼí Library Online

History of the Bahá'í Faith
Bab
1850 in Asia
Public executions